Seung-hee, also spelled Seung-hui, Seung-hi, or Sung-hi, is a Korean unisex given name. The meaning differs based on the hanja used to write each syllable of the name. There are 15 hanja with the reading "seung" and 25 hanja with the reading "hee" on the South Korean government's official list of hanja which may be used in given names.

People with this name include:

Artists and writers
Choi Seung-hee (1911–1969), South Korean female modern dancer
Kim Seung-hee (born 1952), South Korean female poet
Lee Seung-hee (artist) (born 1963), South Korean male ceramic artist
Seung Hee Yang (born 1969), South Korean female violinist
Nikki Seung-hee Lee (born 1970), South Korean-born American female photographer and filmmaker

Athletes
Kim Seung-hee (footballer) (born 1968), South Korean male football manager
Bae Seung-hee (born 1983), South Korean female badminton player
Lee Seung-hee (born 1988), South Korean male footballer
Park Seung-hi (born 1992), South Korean female short track skater

Entertainers
Sung-Hi Lee (born 1970), South Korean-born American female nude model and actress
C. S. Lee (born Lee Seung-hee, 1971), South Korean-born American male actor
Cho Seung-hee (entertainer) (born 1991), South Korean female singer, member of girl groups F-ve Dolls and Dia
Hyun Seung-hee (born 1996), South Korean female singer, member of girl group Oh My Girl

Others
Seung-Hui Cho (1984–2007), South Korean mass murderer responsible for perpetrating the Virginia Tech shooting
Kim Sung-hui, North Korean politician chosen for Sinpha (Constituency 642) in the 2014 North Korean parliamentary election

Fictional characters with this name include:
Choi Seung-hee, female character in 2009 South Korean television series Iris
Han Seung-hee, female character in 2014 South Korean television series Doctor Stranger

See also
List of Korean given names

References

Korean unisex given names